Parliamentary elections were held in the Trust Territory of the Pacific Islands on 5 November 1968, except in the Marshall Islands, where they were delayed until 20 December due to an outbreak of flu.

Electoral system
The bicameral Congress consisted of a 12-member Senate with two members from each of the six districts and a 21-member House of Representatives with seats apportioned to each district based on their population – five from Truk, four from the Marshall Islands and Ponape, three from the Mariana Islands and Palau and two from Yap.

Elections were held every two years in November of even-numbered years, with all members of the House of Representatives and half the Senate (one member from each district) renewed at each election.

Results

Senate

House of Representatives

Aftermath
The newly elected Congress met for the first time on 13 January 1969. Bethwel Henry was elected Speaker of the House of Representatives and Amata Kabua was elected president of the Senate.

Hirosi Ismael (elected in 1966) resigned from the Senate. In the January 1969 by-election, Ambilos Iehsi was elected to replace him. Chutomu Nimues resigned from the House of Delegates later in 1969. Hans Wiliander was elected in the subsequent by-election on 20 November 1969. Minoru Ueki also resigned from Congress, and was replaced by Tarkong Pedro, who won the by-election on 2 April 1970.

References

Trust Territory
1968 in the Trust Territory of the Pacific Islands
Elections in the Federated States of Micronesia
Elections in the Marshall Islands
Elections in Palau
Elections in the Northern Mariana Islands
November 1968 events in Oceania
December 1968 events in Oceania